Thothae is a sub-district in the Wat Bot District of Phitsanulok Province, Thailand.

Name origin
The word thothae means 'tired', "weary", 'downhearted', or 'dejected'.  It is formed from the two elements, tho (Thai: ท้อ) meaning 'discourage', and thae (Thai: แท้) meaning 'real' or 'genuine'.

According to local legend, the village is far from other villages, and the distance can make travellers weary. Despite the negative meaning, residents did not change the village name, only the Buddhist temple Wat Thothae (Thai: วัดท้อแท้) in Thothae was renamed Wat Thong Thae (Thai: วัดทองแท้; lit.: 'real golden temple').

Geography
Thothae lies in the Nan Basin, which is part of the Chao Phraya Watershed.

Administration
The sub-district is divided into eight smaller divisions called (muban), which roughly correspond to villages. There are six villages, two of which occupy several mubans. Thothae is administered by a tambon administrative organization (TAO). The mubans in Thotae are enumerated as follows:

Temples
The following is a list of active Buddhist temples in Thotae:
วัดทองแท้ in Ban Thothae
วัดคุ้งใหญ่ in Ban Thothae
วัดเหล่าขวัญ in Ban Lao Kwang
วัดนอก in Ban Lao Kwang 
วัดดงกระบาก in Ban Dong Ga Bak
วัดสันติวนาราม in Ban Nong Makhang

References

Tambon of Phitsanulok province
Populated places in Phitsanulok province